Karl Friedrich Max von Müller (16 June 1873 – 11 March 1923) was a German naval officer who was the captain of a commerce raider, the light cruiser SMS Emden during the First World War.

Early life and career 
The son of a colonel in the Prussian Army, Müller was born in Hanover. After attending gymnasia at Hanover and Kiel, he entered the military academy at Plön in Schleswig-Holstein, but transferred to the German Imperial Navy at Easter 1891. He served first on the training ship , then on the training ship  on a voyage to the Americas. He became signal lieutenant of the old ironclad  in October 1894, and later transferred in the same capacity to her sister ship .

Müller was promoted to Oberleutnant zur See and posted to the unprotected cruiser . During Schwalbes deployment to German East Africa, he caught malaria, which troubled him for the remainder of his life.

After returning to Germany in 1900, Müller served on shore before becoming second gunnery officer of the pre-dreadnought battleship . An appointment to the staff of Admiral Prince Heinrich of Prussia proved to be the turning point to career success. After receiving high praise and assessments from his superiors, he was promoted to the rank of Korvettenkapitän in December 1908, and assigned to the Reichsmarineamt (Imperial Navy Office) in Berlin, where he impressed Grand Admiral Alfred von Tirpitz.

In command 
As a reward for his admiralty work in Berlin, Müller was given command of the light cruiser  in the spring of 1913. Soon he achieved fame and notoriety in both the German and other imperial powers' newspapers for initiative and skill in shelling rebellious forts along the Yangtze, at Nanking. He was awarded the Order of the Royal Crown (Third Class) with Swords.

At the outbreak of the First World War, Emden was anchored in the German base at Tsingtao. She steamed out to sea on the evening of 31 July 1914, and on 4 August she intercepted and captured the Russian mail steamer Ryazan, the first prize taken by the Imperial German Navy (Kaiserliche Marine) in the Great War. Emden then made rendezvous with the German East Asia Squadron of Admiral Count Maximilian von Spee in the Mariana Islands.

It was during a conference on the island of Pagan that Müller proposed a single light cruiser of the squadron be detached to raid Allied commerce in the Indian Ocean, while the remainder of Spee's squadron continued to steam east across the Pacific. Müller and Emden were given the assignment.

In the following twelve weeks Emden and Müller achieved a reputation for daring and chivalry unequaled by any other German ship or captain. Müller was highly scrupulous about trying to avoid inflicting non-combatant and civilian casualties. While taking fourteen prizes, the only merchant sailors killed by Emdens guns were five victims of a bombardment of Madras that targeted British oil tanks and a merchant ship, despite the care Müller had taken to establish lines of fire that would minimise the risk of hitting civilian areas of the city. Emden also sank the Russian cruiser Zhemchug and the French destroyer Mousquet during a raid on Penang in Malaya. Thirty-six French survivors from Mousquet were rescued by Emden, and when three men died of their injuries they were buried at sea with full honours. The remaining Frenchmen were transferred to a British steamer, Newburn, which had been stopped by the German ship, but not attacked, so as to enable them to be transported to Sabang, Sumatra, in the neutral Dutch East Indies.

Defeat and captivity 

When Emden sent a landing party ashore to destroy a radio station at Port Refuge in the Keeling Islands on 8 November 1914, she was finally cornered by the Australian light cruiser HMAS Sydney and was defeated in the Battle of Cocos by the Australian ship's heavier guns. Müller, with the rest of his surviving crew, was captured and taken to Fort Verdala, Malta. A detachment of his crew which had gone ashore evaded capture and escaped to Germany under the leadership of Emdens first officer, Hellmuth von Mücke. On 8 October 1916, two days after the German resumption of unrestricted submarine warfare, Müller was separated from the rest of the Emden prisoners and taken to England, where he was interned at a prisoner of war camp for German officers located at the Midlands Agricultural and Dairy College (now the Sutton Bonington Campus of the University of Nottingham). In 1917 he led an escape of 21 prisoners through a tunnel, but was recaptured.  The climate of England disagreed with his malaria, and he was eventually sent to the Netherlands for treatment, as part of a humanitarian exchange of prisoners. In October 1918, a month before the armistice, he was repatriated to Germany.

Final years 
Müller was awarded the Pour le Mérite (or Blue Max) and finally promoted to Kapitän zur See. In early 1919, he retired from the Navy on grounds of ill health and settled in Blankenburg. He politely refused to write a book detailing his war service and exploits. He was elected to the state parliament of the Free State of Brunswick on an anti-class platform as a member of the German National People's Party. He died at Brunswick suddenly, probably weakened by frequent malarial bouts, on 11 March 1923.

References and links
The Last Corsair: The Story of The Emden by Dan van der Vat, 1984. 
The Last Gentleman of War. The Raider Exploits of the Cruiser Emden by R. K. Lochner, Naval Institute Press:. 1988. 
The Last Cruise of the Emden: The Amazing True WWI Story of a German-Light Cruiser and Her Courageous Crew by Edwin Palmer Hoyt, Globe Pequot Press, 2001 

Karl Friedrich Max von Müller: Captain of the Emden During World War I by John M. Taylor
New York Times: German Cruiser Emden Destroyed, November 11, 1914 a PDF of NYT's report on Emden's sinking along with some praise for its captain.
How German cruiser ‘Emden’ struck terror in the heart of the British Empire, and became a Tamil word, February 22, 2020 
New York Times: Captain of Emden Killed?, a PDF of an NYT article dated April 13, 1921

Diving Pulu Keeling National Park and the Emden, A story about diving on the remains of the wreck of the Emden, along with pictures and a brief account of her final battle.

1873 births
1923 deaths
Deaths from malaria
Politicians from Hanover
Military personnel from Hanover
People from the Province of Hanover
Imperial German Navy personnel of World War I
Recipients of the Pour le Mérite (military class)